Thornton-in-Craven railway station was a railway station that served the small village of Thornton-in-Craven in North Yorkshire (formerly the West Riding of Yorkshire) England. It was built by the Leeds and Bradford Extension Railway and opened in 1848. It was simply known as Thornton with the in-Craven section not being added to the name until 1937.

Situated on the edge of the village and below it, the station closed in 1970 (along with the railway), having previously avoided earlier closure proposals in 1959 and the Beeching Axe of 1963. The  closure notice for the villages' railway station was met with indifference as it was pointed out by residents that the bus service was frequent and reliable and the railway station was remote from the village.  The service had also been poor in latter years, with just two eastbound and four westbound trains calling each weekday and no calls at all on a Sunday.

The last trains ran on Sunday 1 February 1970, with the line closing the next day, Monday 2 February.  The track through the station was lifted later that year and the main building on the westbound platform demolished by 1973.

The former station house survived demolition and is now privately owned; the trackbed is used as a footpath and bridleway and has a parking area for the nearby cricket ground.

The railway between Colne and Skipton is proposed for re-opening to enable a cross-Pennine service and allow residents access to Leeds within one hour. This campaign is being promoted by SELRAP (Skipton East Lancashire Rail Action Partnership.) One of the scoping reports commissioned by SELRAP notes that between Colne and Skipton, there would be only two intermediate stations at Foulridge and Earby. Thornton-in-Craven does not appear as a proposal for reopening.

References

External links 
Thornton-in-Craven.com pictures

Disused railway stations in North Yorkshire
Former Midland Railway stations
Railway stations in Great Britain opened in 1848
Railway stations in Great Britain closed in 1970
Beeching closures in England